The Kaskaskia River is a tributary of the Mississippi River, approximately  long, in central and southern Illinois in the United States. The second largest river system within Illinois, it drains a rural area of farms, as well as rolling hills along river bottoms of hardwood forests in its lower reaches.  The lower reaches of the river have been canalized to allow barge traffic.

"Cascasquia" is an alternative, supposedly more French, spelling of "Kaskaskia" that is sometimes encountered. It was named after a clan of the Illiniwek encountered by the early French Jesuits and other settlers.  "Okaw River" was an alternative name for the Kaskaskia that persists in place names along the river, including Okawville, and in a major tributary, the West Okaw River.

Hydrography
The Kaskaskia rises in east central Illinois in several farm ditches along the west side of Champaign. The headwaters of the river is just north of Interstate 74, where it is marked with a sign. The river flows south across rural Champaign and Douglas counties, then southwest across southern Illinois, past Vandalia.

The Kaskaskia is impounded in Shelby County to form Lake Shelbyville.  It is also impounded in Clinton County southwest of Vandalia to form Carlyle Lake.

For most of the 19th century, the river joined the Mississippi at Chester.  Deforestation of river banks of the Mississippi and tributaries to fuel the hundreds of steamboats that plied the river had several significant environmental effects: destabilizing the banks, causing the Mississippi to become wider and more shallow, causing more severe flooding and leading to lateral channel changes in the American Bottoms area.  In the aftermath of a major 1881 flood, the Mississippi changed its channel and moved east to flow along the lower  of the channel of the Kaskaskia, shifting the confluence 10 miles north.  As a result, a small portion of Illinois, including the former capital, Kaskaskia, was cut off from Illinois when the river moved to its east side.  It is now located on the west side of the Mississippi.  The community of Kaskaskia can now only be reached from the Missouri shore.  The Kaskaskia River State Fish & Wildlife Area is located along the lower river in southern Illinois.

Fort Kaskaskia was located near the mouth of the river in Randolph County.

See also
List of Illinois rivers
Becks Creek, tributary of the river.

References

External links

Kaskaskia River State Fish & Wildlife Area
Kaskaskia River Watershed
Northern Illinois University: Kaskaskia River in Randolph County
Surf the Upper Kaskaskia with USEPA
Surf the Middle Kaskaskia
Surf the Shoal Watershed
Surf the Lower Kaskaskia

Rivers of Illinois
Tributaries of the Mississippi River
Rivers of Champaign County, Illinois
Rivers of Shelby County, Illinois
Rivers of Clinton County, Illinois
Rivers of Randolph County, Illinois